Ormetica postradiata is a moth of the family Erebidae. It was described by William Schaus in 1924. It is found in Colombia.

References

Ormetica
Moths described in 1924